Zhao Zhengyong (born March 1951) is a former politician of the People's Republic of China who served as Communist Party Secretary, Governor, and Congress Chairman of Shaanxi Province. After his retirement, he was placed under investigation for corruption.

Career
Zhao Zhengyong was born in Ma'anshan, Anhui Province in March 1951, and joined the Chinese Communist Party in November 1973. He is a graduate of Central South Mining and Metallurgy Institute (now part of Central South University). He worked at the Maanshan Iron and Steel Company before becoming chief of the Communist Youth League and then deputy Communist Party Chief of his native Ma'anshan in Anhui province. He then became the party chief of Huangshan City and later the public security chief of Anhui.

In June 2001, Zhao was transferred to the provincial government of Shaanxi, becoming a vice governor in January 2005. In June 2010 he was appointed the acting governor of Shaanxi, and confirmed as Governor by the Shaanxi Provincial Congress in January 2011. In December 2012 he was promoted to Communist Party Chief of Shaanxi province, replacing Zhao Leji, and Lou Qinjian was appointed Governor in his place. On 27 March 2016, Zhao Zhengyong stepped down from as Party Chief and was again succeeded by Lou Qinjian. Zhao was named a deputy chair of the National People's Congress Internal and Judicial Affairs Committee. Zhao was involved in the illegally constructed villas in the Qinling Mountains.

Zhao was a member of the 18th Central Committee of the Chinese Communist Party.

Investigation
On January 15, 2019, it was announced that Zhao was under investigation by the Central Commission for Discipline Inspection, the Communist Party's internal disciplinary body, and the National Supervisory Commission, China's highest anti-corruption agency, for "serious violations of regulations and laws". He was expelled from the Communist Party on January 4, 2020, and his qualification for delegates to the 13th CCP Shaanxi Provincial Congress was terminated. The day Zhao stepped down, his fellow townsman and subordinate, Chen Guoqiang, vice-governor of Shaanxi, was also taken away for investigation. Wei Minzhou, former chief of Shaanxi's capital city Xi'an, was known to be a close ally of Zhao, was placed under investigation for serious violations of regulations in May 2017.

On May 11, 2020, Zhao's trial was held at the First Intermediate People's Court of Tianjin. The public prosecutors accused him of abusing his positions between 2003 and 2018 to seek benefits for others in terms of job promotions, energy resources exploration and utilization, business activities and project contracting and received a huge amount of gifts and money in return. On July 31, he was sentenced to the death penalty with reprieve by the First Intermediate People's Court of Tianjin after he was found to have accepted more than 717 million yuan ($102.4 million) in bribes. The court said that "Zhao was given a two-year reprieve for his death penalty and deprived of political rights for life, with his personal property confiscated. After he finishes the two-year probation, his death penalty will be reduced to life imprisonment without commutation or parole." He was also deprived of his political rights for life, and ordered by the court to have all his personal assets confiscated. He said he accepted the sentence and would not appeal.

Personal life
Zhao married Sun Jianhui, the couple have a daughter. Zhao has a younger brother named Zhao Zhengfa. After the downfall of Zhao Zhengyong, his wife, younger brother, and daughter were arrested for investigation.

References 

1951 births
Living people
Governors of Shaanxi
Chinese Communist Party politicians from Anhui
People's Republic of China politicians from Anhui
Chinese police officers
Politicians from Ma'anshan
Expelled members of the Chinese Communist Party